Two classes of British locomotives have carried the designation Class 70:
 British Rail Class 70 (electric), introduced by the Southern Railway in 1941
 British Rail Class 70 (diesel), a class of diesel locomotives introduced in 2009